To be distinguished from the operetta La Parranda by Francisco Alonso from 1928.

"La Parranda" ("The Big Party") is a 1996 song by Cuban American singer-songwriter Gloria Estefan, released as the third promotional single and the fifth overall from her second Spanish-language album, Abriendo Puertas. It was a promotional single only sent to US Latin radio stations to promote the album. Although the song received full remix treatment, it did not make it onto the Billboard Hot Dance Club Play chart.

Track listing

Charts

External links
 Gloria Estefan Discography Database

1996 singles
Gloria Estefan songs
Spanish-language songs
Songs written by Kike Santander
1995 songs
Epic Records singles